Albert Ray Newsome (1894–1951) was an author, editor, educator, and historian in North Carolina, and served as chairman of the University of North Carolina at Chapel Hill’s Department of History. Newsome also served as the first President of the Society of American Archivists from 1936–1939.

He co-authored North Carolina: The History of a Southern State along with Hugh Talmage Lefler in 1954. In 1996, Newsome’s grandson Christopher Quackenbush established “The Albert Ray Newsome Distinguished Professorship for the Study of the South".

Early life 
Newsome was born on June 4, 1894, in Marshville, North Carolina to Richard Clyde and Julia Ross Newsome.

Education 
In 1915, Newsome graduated from the University of North Carolina at the top of his class. He then taught history in their public school system for a few years, along with teaching at Bessie Tift College in Georgia. He then earned a doctoral degree from the University of Michigan.

Academia 
In 1923, Newsome returned to UNC as an assistant professor. In 1926, he accepted a post as the Secretary of the NC Historical Commission, now called the State Department of Archives and History.

Newsome returned to University of North Carolina at Chapel Hill in 1936, when he became their chairman of the History Department. He also served as the first president of the Society of American Archivists between 1936-1939.

References

1894 births
1951 deaths
20th-century American historians
20th-century American male writers
American archivists
University of Michigan alumni
People from Marshville, North Carolina
Presidents of the Society of American Archivists
American male non-fiction writers